Barcelona Sporting Club is an Ecuadorian sports club based in Guayaquil, known best for its professional football team. The current president of Barcelona is Carlos Alfaro Moreno.

List of chairmen

External links
Barcelona SC, Club's official website

List Presidents
Barcelona